Kyle LeDuc (born July 29, 1981) is an American professional racing driver. He mainly competes in short course off-road truck racing, where he has seven Pro 4 class championships, six of which came in the Lucas Oil Off Road Racing Series (LOORRS), and over 100 career wins. , he races in Championship Off-Road (COR) and Extreme E, the latter for Chip Ganassi Racing.

LeDuc has also raced in Championship Off-Road Racing, Stadium Super Trucks, and TORC: The Off-Road Championship.

Racing career
After growing up in mountain bike racing, during which he won various downhill championships, LeDuc switched to desert racing. In 1999 and 2000, he ran the SCORE International Laughlin Desert Challenge and scored the Baja 2000 Class 8 win during the latter. In 2002, he began short course off-road competition; at the age of 20, he was the youngest driver in active off-road competition at the time, which gave him the nickname "The Kid". The next year, he won the Prolite World Championship at Crandon International Off-Road Raceway, followed by the Championship Off-Road Racing Pro Lite title in 2004. In addition to competing in Pro Lite, he worked as a spotter and assistant for his father Curt's Pro 4 truck. While Curt was competing in the Dakar Rally, the younger LeDuc assembled his own Pro 4 chassis using components from his father's truck and was encouraged by Pro Lite sponsor Rockstar Energy to move into the higher class.

LeDuc made his Pro 4 debut in 2008, winning three times in his first season. In 2009, he began racing in the Lucas Oil Off Road Racing Series and Traxxas TORC Series, finishing second in the latter's championship. He also won the 2009 BorgWarner Cup at Crandon and 2010 Lucas Oil Challenge Cup; the latter is a race between Pro 2 and Pro 4 trucks. After finishing runner-up in the 2010 and 2011 LOORRS standings, LeDuc won the 2012 championship by 14 points over brother Todd LeDuc with seven victories, six of which were consecutive to start the season. He also won his second Challenge Cup.

In 2012, LeDuc conducted testing for the Stadium Super Trucks ahead of their inaugural season in 2013. He debuted in the series at the 2013 finale in Las Vegas; he won his heat race but finished last in the final after being involved in an accident. Two years later, LeDuc returned to SST for the Grand Prix of Long Beach and X Games Austin 2015. He finished tenth in Long Beach after starting fourth. At the X Games, he set the second-fastest time in qualifying, followed by finishing runner-up in his heat and ninth in the main. In 2016, he ran the SST weekend at the Sand Sports Super Show; after finishing seventh in the Friday night race, he was involved in a crash in the Saturday heat race that resulted in Tyler McQuarrie flipping onto his roof, which was followed by placing on the podium in the feature in third.

From 2014 to 2017, LeDuc won four consecutive LOORRS Pro 4 championships. The 2014 season saw him win 11 of 14 and receive LOORRS Driver of the Year honors; he also won the TORC World Championship Ring and AMSOIL Cup. In 2015, he set the LOORRS record for most Pro 4 wins in a row at ten and he ended the year with 12. LeDuc battled with Carl Renezeder for the 2016 championship and the two finished the year tied in points, with LeDuc claiming the tiebreaker as his eight wins outweighed Rezender's two. The fifth title came as part of a five-win campaign. The stretch also saw him win the Challenge Cup in 2014, 2016, and 2017.

After winning the 2016 LOORRS Pro 4 title, LeDuc entered the Baja 1000 for Riviera Racing alongside Mark Post, who was officially listed as the team's driver in the race results. LeDuc won the pole position after setting the fastest qualifying time and Post finished fifth.

A sixth LOORRS Pro 4 title and fifth Challenge Cup came in 2019. Low entry numbers forced LOORRS to cancel the 2020 Pro 4 season, which prompted LeDuc to join the newly formed Championship Off-Road series in the same class. He won five of ten races, including the final weekend at Crandon, and the COR championship for his seventh title in Pro 4. When he swept the COR weekend at ERX Motor Park in July, he scored his 100th career win.

Shortly after his 100th race victory, Chip Ganassi Racing signed LeDuc for the first Extreme E season in 2021, sharing an electric SUV with fellow off-road racer and X Games athlete Sara Price.

Personal life
LeDuc grew up in Cherry Valley, California. Father Curt competed in short course and desert racing while older brother Todd has also raced in LOORRS and Monster Jam.

He lives in Fairhope, Alabama, and has two children.

Motorsports career results

Career summary

Stadium Super Trucks
(key) (Bold – Pole position. Italics – Fastest qualifier. * – Most laps led.)

Extreme E
(key)

* Season still in progress.

Notes

References

External links
 

1981 births
Off-road racing drivers
Racing drivers from California
Sportspeople from Riverside County, California
Stadium Super Trucks drivers
X Games athletes
Living people
Extreme E drivers
Chip Ganassi Racing drivers